Masayo Imura (born August 16, 1950 in Osaka, Japan) is a Japanese synchronized swimming instructor known as the "mother of synchro". She is currently the head coach of the Japanese National Synchronised Swimming Team.

Career

In 1963, she became synchronized swimmer and retired in 1973. In the 1974 she became a coach and coached the Japan's National Synchronised Swimming Team from 1978 to 2004.

In 1968 and 1973 she was a member of the Japan's national synchronised swimming champion team.

From 1984-2004 she was Head Coach of Japan's Synchronised Swimming Team for six Olympic Games in a row. Her team won silvers at the 2000 and 2004 Olympic Games.

In 2007, she became the head coach of China's synchronized team.

References 

http://2008teamchina.olympic.cn/index.php/personview/personsen/2641

Japanese synchronized swimmers
Living people
1950 births
Sportspeople from Osaka
Japanese expatriate sportspeople in China
Synchronized swimming coaches